A Royal Divorce may refer to:
 A Royal Divorce (1926 film)
 A Royal Divorce (1938 film)
 A Royal Divorce (play), a play by W. G. Wills